Yuriy Ivanovych Zbitnyev (born October 25, 1963 in Smila) was a candidate in the 2004 Ukrainian presidential election, nominated by the "New Power" Party.

Background 
Zbitnyev was a founding member of the "Young Ukraine" party in 1999 and is a member of the coordinating board of public non-governmental organization "Union of tax payers of Ukraine". In 2000, he founded a Ukraine-wide association of manufacturers of infusion solutions, which includes 14 enterprises. In 1999 he created a company "Gramed", which manufactured pharmaceutical medications. From 1995 to 1996 he was first vice-chair of the central board of the Social Democratic Party of Ukraine (united). In his program he proposes reducing the number of administrative divisions of Ukraine (oblasts) from 24 to 9.

References

External links
Official website  

1963 births
Living people
People from Smila
Social Democratic Party of Ukraine (united) politicians
Candidates in the 2004 Ukrainian presidential election